The National Triathlon or Tri-Zone is a relatively new event for Venture Scouts, that was run for the first time in September 2005. In this physical challenge teams of two people from a Venture Group complete a set course combining rafting, cycling and mountaineering.

Teams

Each team consists of two Ventures, who must be registered as Venture Scouts in the National Office. Mixed teams are allowed, as long as two separate tents are provided for the team.

Equipment

The equipment that is brought is arguably the most important aspect for any team. The recommended items to bring are:
Food and cooking facilities (i.e. trangia)
Tent(s)
Hiking Boots
Raingear
The participant's own bike
Runners for rafting (these will get wet) and runners for cycling
Sleeping bag, Spare clothes etc...
First aid kit

Competition

Although Tri-Zone is technically a competition, it is also an opportunity for Ventures to have fun, and try new things.

See also

Scouting Ireland
Triathlon
Ventures

References

Scouting events
Recurring events established in 2005